The Women Divers Hall of Fame (WDHOF) is an international honor society. Its purpose is to honor the accomplishments of women divers, and their contributions to various fields of underwater diving. Full membership is restricted to nominees who have been found to meet the WDHOF's criteria, which include being an underwater diver and having contributed to diving in ways recognised as being significant.

The WDHOF was founded in 1999 by a group of people and organizations, including the Underwater Society of America. The initial 72 women were inducted in 2000, followed by 26 new members the next year.

The WDHOF also awards scholarships and training grants.

Members
As of 2022, there are 250 members. They include (induction-year in parentheses):
 Pamela Balash-Webber (2022), co-founder of the Virgin Islands Diving Association, PADI course director, and promoter of ocean conservation.
 Carole Baldwin (2003), scientist, author, and educator. An authority on marine biology, especially tropical-marine fishes, conservation and sustainable seafood.
 Sally Bauer (2011), diving museum founder and historian, aquaculturist, author, and public speaker.
 Wendy Benchley (2015), marine conservation leader, governmental policy advocate, and spokesperson on shark conservation.

 Bette Bolivar (2005), US Navy Diving and Salvage Officer; commanding Officer of USS Salvor, and of the Navy Mobile Diving and Salvage Unit.
 Mary Bonnin (2001), first woman US Navy Master Diver; US Navy diving instructor; and naval diving safety advocate.
 Cathy Church (2000)
 Eugenie Clark (2000)
 Laurel B. Clark (2003)
 Céline Cousteau (2011)(
 Annie Crawley (2010)
 Mandy-Rae Cruickshank (2009)
 Sylvia Earle (2000), oceanographer and marine biologist (former Chief Scientist at NOAA), author and consultant.
 Dottie Frazier (2000)
 Honor Frost (2019)
 Lotte Hass (2000)
 Hillary Hauser (2000)
 Mehgan Heaney-Grier (2000)
 Jill Heinerth (2000)
 Denise Herzing (2021)
 Lauren Hutton (2007)
 Darlene Iskra (2008), US Navy diving and salvage officer, first woman to command a commissioned US Navy ship, public speaker, and author.
 Karen Kohanowich (2001)

 Gloria Macapagal-Arroyo (2007)
 Dení Ramírez Macías (2021)
 Simone Melchior-Cousteau (2017)
 Audrey Mestre (2002)
 Zale Parry (2000)
 Lesley Rochat (2010)
 Dee Scarr (2000)
 Claudia Serpieri (2002)
 Heidemarie Stefanyshyn-Piper (2007)
 Tanya Streeter (2000)
 Kathryn Sullivan (2008)
 Valerie Taylor (2000)
 Donna Tobias (2001)
 Ruth Turner (2001)
 Michele Westmorland (2011)
 Susan Williams(2019)
 Cristina Zenato. (2011), shark protection consultant; TDI and NSS-CDS technical and full cave instructor; explorer, surveyor and mapper of cave systems; and ocean advocate.

References

External links

Women Divers Hall of Fame Introduction V2, WDHOF video

Underwater diving
Sports halls of fame
Science and technology halls of fame
Honor societies